William McComb (November 21, 1828 – July 12, 1918) was a Confederate brigadier general. He was born in Pennsylvania, but moved to Tennessee. McComb fought in many important battles of the Civil War's Eastern Theater.

Early life
McComb was born in Mercer County, Pennsylvania. He took up residence in Clarksville, Tennessee, in 1854. He erected a flour mill in Cumberland County and was involved in various manufacturing interests.

Civil War
When the Civil War broke out, McComb chose the Confederacy despite his Northern birth and enlisted as a private in the 14th Tennessee Infantry Regiment. Soon after his enlistment, McComb was elected second lieutenant, then major of his regiment. The 14th Tennessee was part of Brig. Gen. James Archer's brigade in A.P. Hill's "Light Division" of the Army of Northern Virginia. McComb became Colonel of his regiment in September 1862.

McComb was wounded in several battles, including Gaines' Mill, Antietam, and Chancellorsville. In August 1863, he took command of Brig. Gen. Cadmus M. Wilcox's old Alabama brigade. He commanded this unit through the Overland Campaign and on through the Siege of Petersburg. He was finally promoted to brigadier general on January 20, 1865. He was paroled at Appomattox Court House.

Postbellum career
After the war, McComb lived in Alabama and Mississippi, eventually settling in Gordonsville, Louisa County, Virginia, where he was a farmer for nearly fifty years. McComb died on his plantation. He was buried in Mechanicsville Cemetery in Boswells, Virginia.

See also

List of American Civil War generals (Confederate)

Notes

References
 Eicher, John H., and David J. Eicher, Civil War High Commands. Stanford: Stanford University Press, 2001. .
 Sifakis, Stewart. Who Was Who in the Civil War. New York: Facts On File, 1988. .
 Warner, Ezra J. Generals in Gray: Lives of the Confederate Commanders. Baton Rouge: Louisiana State University Press, 1959. .

1828 births
1918 deaths
People from Mercer County, Pennsylvania
People of Pennsylvania in the American Civil War
Confederate States Army brigadier generals
People from Gordonsville, Virginia
Northern-born Confederates